Johann Konrad von Roggenbach (1618–1693) was the Prince-Bishop of Basel from 1656 to 1693.

Biography

Johann Konrad von Roggenbach was born in Rhein on 15 December 1618.  He was ordained as a priest on 4 April 1654.

On 22 December 1656 the cathedral chapter of Basel Münster elected him to be the new Prince-Bishop of Basel.  Pope Alexander VII confirmed his appointment on 13 January 1658, and he was consecrated as a bishop by Federico Borromeo (iuniore) on 23 March 1659.

He died on 13 July 1693.

References

1618 births
1693 deaths
Prince-Bishops of Basel